Magnolia oblonga, also known as borsopa, ful-sopa, or kothal-sopa, is a tree species native to the Northeastern region of India. It can grow up to 50 meters high and is usually buttressed at the base.

Description 
The leaves of Magnolia oblonga are oblanceolate, obovate-oblong, acute at the base, shortly acuminate at the apex, and coriaceous. They are 8-15 centimeters long and 4-6 centimeters wide, shiny on the upper surface, and glaucous on the lower surface. The lateral nerves are 10-12 pairs, and the tertiaries are laxly reticulate, conspicuous on both surfaces. The petioles are 1.5-2.5 centimeters long and swollen at the base, while the stipules are narrowly oblong and as long as the petiole. The bark is grey, rough, warty, and about 2-4 centimeters thick, with an aromatic scent.

Magnolia oblonga produces axillary solitary flowers that are white, scarcely scented, and have short, annulate pedicels. The buds are ovoid, elongate, and about 2.5 centimeters long. The perianth parts are 12, white, fading to pale yellow, and narrowly obovate-lanceolate, about 2.5-3.5 centimeters long. The species has about 50 stamens, with filaments that are about 2.5 millimeters long and anthers that are 1.5-2 centimeters long. The carpels are ovoid, about 1.25 x 1 millimeters, and glabrous. Magnolia oblonga produces 40 or more carpels, and the stylar crest is as long as the ovary.

The fruiting receptacle of Magnolia oblonga can grow up to 15 centimeters long. The ripe carpels are sessile, lax, obovoid, about 20 x 12 millimeters, woody, lenticellate, beaked, and speckled. The species blooms from February to May and produces fruits from July to October.

Habitat and distribution 
Magnolia oblonga is found in evergreen forests and plains up to 1200 meters above sea level in Assam and Meghalaya, India. It was first described by Wallich ex Hook. f. & Thomson in Fl. Ind. in 1855 and later in Fl. Brit. India in 1872. The species is also known by other names, such as bewa-champhe and chambi-sirsang in the Garo language and dieng-ta-rai in the Khmer language.

References 

oblonga